Novak Djokovic defeated the eight-time defending champion Rafael Nadal in the final, 6–2, 7–6(7–1) to win the singles tennis title at the 2013 Monte-Carlo Masters. With the win, Djokovic ended Nadal's 46-match winning streak at the event, the longest win streak at a single tournament in tennis history. Additionally, Djokovic became the first man to win singles titles at eight of the nine Masters 1000 tournaments (he eventually won the ninth, Cincinnati, to complete the career Golden Masters).

Seeds
The top eight seeds receive a bye into the second round.

Draw

Finals

Top half

Section 1

Section 2

Bottom half

Section 3

Section 4

Qualifying

Seeds

Qualifiers

Draw

First qualifier

Second qualifier

Third qualifier

Fourth qualifier

Fifth qualifier

Sixth qualifier

Seventh qualifier

References

External links
 Main draw
 Qualifying draw

2013 Monte-Carlo Rolex Masters